The Cassiar Mountains are the most northerly group of the Northern Interior Mountains in the Canadian province of British Columbia and also extend slightly into the southernmost Yukon Territory.  They lie north and west of the Omineca Mountains, west of the northernmost Rockies and the Rocky Mountain Trench, north of the Hazelton Mountains and east of the Boundary Ranges. They form a section of the Continental Divide, that, in this region, separates water drainage between the Arctic and Pacific Oceans. Physiographically, they are a section of the larger Yukon-Tanana Uplands province, which in turn are part of the larger Intermontane Plateaus physiographic division.

In the western Cassiar Mountains lie the remnants of a prehistoric shield volcano called the Maitland Volcano which formed between 5 and 4 million years ago during the Pliocene period.

Sub-ranges and major summits
Dease Plateau
Horseranch Range
Kechika Ranges
Mount Skook Davidson
Sifton Ranges
Cormier Range
Ruby Range
Stikine Ranges
Beady Range
Nisutlin Plateau
Skree Range
Three Sisters Range
Thudaka Range
Thudaka Peak
Tuya Range
Ash Mountain

References

 
Physiographic sections
Northern Interior of British Columbia
Mountain ranges of British Columbia
Mountain ranges of Yukon